The Ferrari 312 PB was a Group 6 Prototype-Sports Car introduced in 1971 by Italian carmaker Ferrari. It was officially designated the 312 P, but often known as the 312 PB to avoid confusion with a previous car of the same name. It was part of the Ferrari P series of Prototype-Sports Cars but was redesignated as a Group 5 Sports Car for 1972.

Development
In 1970, a change in the regulations for sportscar racing for 1972 was announced.

Porsche considered this too heavy as their Porsche 908/03 were  lighter, and this advantage would have been lost . Thus, Porsche did not enter world championship sports car races after 1971 and sold the 908s to customers who would have to add weight to them. Matra and Alfa Romeo were willing and able to compete, but only in selected seasons or events. Also, Ford's successful Formula 1 Cosworth-V8 engine was available for independent chassis builders, but vibrations made it unreliable for endurance racing.

After having been beaten by the Porsche 917 in 1970, Ferrari abandoned further development of the Ferrari 512M, leaving the 512 to customer teams like Penske Racing and NART. 

Instead, in 1971, Ferrari focused on a new 3.0L prototype based on the Tipo 001 flat-12 engine from the 312B F1 car. Officially this design was known as 312P, the motorsports press appending the B to avoid confusion with the earlier 312P V12 cars. This design was similar to the traditional Porsche engine layout with its low center of gravity, but Ferrari used water-cooling and 4-valve heads. The car was promising, but did not win, while the similar Alfa Romeo 33 scored two wins against Porsche's dominance.  The 312PB's engine has many similarities in design to the F1 engine, but nearly every part is different and non-interchangeable with the F1 flat 12. This has led to problems for users of these cars in historic racing, as spare parts for these quite fragile engines, are, in comparison to the F1 flat 12 engine, very difficult to obtain.

Racing history

The car first appeared at the 1971 1000 km of Buenos Aires in Argentina at the hands of Italians Ignazio Giunti and Arturo Merzario. Its history started off tragically when Giunti was killed in this race after he hit Jean-Pierre Beltoise's Matra head-on while the Frenchman was pushing the stricken car back to the pits. The car did not win a race that season. In 1972, with only Alfa answering the challenge, the 312 PB was very successful and won all World Sportscar Championship races in which it was entered. Ferrari skipped Le Mans, though, as the F1-based engine had not lasted 24 hours in testing and would surely spoil their otherwise perfect record.

In 1973, Matra which had previously focused on Le Mans also challenged for the championship while Alfa was absent. As Matra won several races, Ferrari needed to enter in the 1973 24 Hours of Le Mans, with an improved yet still doubtful engine. One car was used as a "hare" which supposed to lure the Matras into driving faster laps than they intended, to test their reliability. Ironically it was only the "hare" Ferrari which survived the 24 hours, finishing a respectable second behind a Matra. The championship saw the same order, with only two Italian wins compared to five French. In addition, despite the absence of the Matras, the 312 PB could not defend the 1972 win of the Targa Florio as the prototypes of Ferrari and Alfas failed and a Porsche 911 collected a surprise win.

At the end of the 1973 season, Ferrari abandoned sports car racing to focus on F1 again, as the F1 team had even skipped GP races in 1973 due to lack of competitiveness.

References

Cruickshank, G. 2006. Profile: Ferrari 312PB. Motor Sport, LXXXII/11, p. 43

External links

312 PB
Sports prototypes

sv:Ferrari 312P